Municipal elections were held in Monaco on 17 March 2019 to elect the 15 members of the Communal Council of Monaco.

Electoral system 
Monegasque citizens over 18 are entitled to vote. The 15 councillors were elected for a four-year period in a single multi-member constituency using plurality-at-large voting with a two-round system. A majority of the votes was required to be elected. The second round would have been held one week after the first round. The Mayor of Monaco was elected by the councillors after the election. Candidates were required to be at least 21 years old and to have the Monegasque nationality for at least 5 years.

Results

Summary

Full results

References 

2019
Mon
Municipal election
March 2019 events in Europe